Tham Jang is a cave just to the southwest of Vang Vieng, Laos. Approached by a bridge over the Nam Song River and then a long flight of steps, a spring is located about  inside the cave. The cave was used as a bunker in the early 19th century during the Chinese-Ho invasion.

References

External links
Tham Chang
Video

Caves of Laos
Geography of Vientiane province